Joseph Francis Petric (born October 8, 1952) is a Canadian concert accordionist, historian, author, and pedagogue.

Formation

Formal training 
Petric began private studies at the Royal Conservatory with Joe Macerollo in 1968. In 1971 he was accepted into a liberal arts program at Queen's University and began studies in the humanities, Russian, history of philosophy, art history, and performance. In 1972 he transferred into Queen's Bachelor of Music program, while continuing his performance studies at the Royal Conservatory (1971–5). In the music program, Petric studied analysis with Istvan Anhalt, electronic music and improvisation with David Keane, and interpretation with Denise Narcisse-Maire. He subsequently achieved his Master of Arts in Musicology (1975–7) at the University of Toronto after studying with Rika Maniates, Carl Morey, and Andrew Hughes. Petric continued private performance studies upon completion of his musicology degree. He went to West Germany to study with Hugo Noth at the Staatliche Hochschule für Musik Trossingen, and then studied jazz with Pat LaBarbara at Humber College Toronto (1981–2). In the 1990s Petric received a Canada Council Senior Artists B Grant, and rounded out his education by studying  the acoustic properties of early instruments and period interpretation with Renaissance specialist Leslie Huggett (1992–8), harpsichordist Colin Tilney (1997–2010), and Haydn forte-pianist Boyd McDonald (2009–15).[2]

Technique 
Petric's career operates on the margins of institutional traditions, a philosophy that is informed by his predilection for musical precursors and the humanities. By 1986 Petric had developed a sound based on Classical Italian operatic technique and Enrico Cecchetti’s artistic principles that emphasize regimen, lyricism, stamina, and mastery of rhetoric and technique. Petric’s approach creates a unique sound that has subtle colouristic and expressive devices like vibrato, which is an innovation in accordion performance. This holistic approach is foundational for his delivery of diverse musical languages and accordion repertoire in the contemporary concert hall.

Repertoire

Commissions 
Commissioning new works has been a salient focus throughout Petric's career. To date his list of solo, concerto, electroacoustic, and chamber music commissions include some 340 works that rebalance elements of the classical canon into a dialogical medium., Petric’s electroacoustic works (1986–2019) make frequent use of canonical pieces, although presenting them in an entirely new musical aesthetic. These works embraced the legacy of Hugh LeCaine’s 1948 NRC electronic studio, and were also products of the burgeoning and experimental electronic music studios at Queen's University (1976–7), University of Toronto (1982), McGill University (with Alcides Lanza, 1988), Conservatoire de Montréal,  ACREQ (with Yves Daoust, Serge Arcuri, Gabriele Ledoux, Symon Henry; 1986–2018), the Canadian Electronic Ensemble studio (with David Jaeger, Jim Montgomery, Larry Lake; 1986–2020), and University of British Columbia (with Bob Pritchard and Keith Hamel, 2000–06).

Despite the electroacoustic genre being largely confined to experimental and avant garde circles (e.g works by David Jaeger, Christos Hatzis, and Larry Lake), these works were welcomed enthusiastically over decades in programs Petric intended for general audiences. These pieces included innovative digital and computer stochastic programming, live digital delay systems, electroacoustic CD playback, interactive software, sound processing, techno-chamber, live computer systems, and MAC patch software. Petric’s 2018 concert and masterclasses at the Staatliche Hochschule für Musik Trossingen stimulated strong interest in the genre, which helped revitalize a Bavarian electronic studio there.

Concerti 
Petric’s career has been driven by commissioning and performing concerti. The 20 concerti commissioned by Petric between 1986 and 2022 are an unprecedented and stylistically diverse contribution to the accordion repertoire, with works by Norman Symonds (1986), Peter Paul Koprowski (1994), Howard Skempton (1996 & 98), Omar Daniel (1998), Paul Frehner (2002), Denis Gougeon (2004), James Rolfe (2005), Brian Current (2009), and David Mott (2019), among others. Between 1995 and 1997, Petric gave 30 performances of these concerto commissions throughout Europe and North America. Several of these performances were recorded live to air by the CBC and Société Radio Canada. On 8 October 2010, Petric performed three concertos in one night in a concert featuring works by Gougeon, Current, and Piazzolla performed by the Victoria Symphony and Maestra Tania Miller.

Re-creations 
Influenced by the writings of Walter Benjamin’s Task of the Translator (1923), Petric embraces the values of adaptation and palimpsest as “re-imagined conversations” in a time rife with univocal transcriptions and autonomous works. His textual destabilizations were welcomed by postmodern audiences in programs including Rameau, Torbjorn Lundquist, Schubert, Hatzis, Bach, and Lake.

Performing arts 
Petric's performance career began within the cultural and conservatory contexts of the accordion. By the early 1980s it was clear that his performances had moved beyond orthodox traditions and his work had entered a distinctly post-colonial trajectory, forming a decentered concert art that draws inspiration from a diversity of sources. This transformative period included the mastery of multiple musical "languages", among them: free improvisation, comprovisation, electroacousticism, multi-media, theatrical works, and the emerging "languages" of techno-chamber (with computer and software), the post-colonial concerto, and the demands of rhetoric in the art of palimpsest.

Touring 
Petric had the support of six international agencies between 1986 and 2000, including MGAM Toronto, RCPA Toronto, Columbia Artists USA, Sarah Turner Communications Paris, NCCP London, and Swedish Reikskonzerter Stockholm. Official debuts at Washington’s Kennedy Center and St. John Smiths Square in London generated strong interest in Petric’s repertoire and technique. In fact, Petric was the first accordionist to give official concert debuts on both sides of the Atlantic, and these events lead to invitations for extensive international tours across North America, Europe, the Middle East, former Soviet Bloc, Scandinavia, and Asia. These tours included performances at venues like the Institut de recherche et coordination acoustique / musique (IRCAM), Tanglewood Music Festival, Kennedy Center, The Berlin Philharmonic Chamber Music Hall, Disney Centre, Israeli Opera at Tel Aviv, Jerusalem Festival, and Tokyo Spring.

His appearances included return engagements with Musique Royale, Debut Atlantic, Encore Atlantic, Prairie Debut, John Lewis Partnership (UK), Jeunesses Musicales, Columbia Artists Community Concerts, and Sweden's Reikskonzerter. In 2009 he began a series of intercontinental tours with tenor Christoph Prégardien in Normand Forget’s chamber adaptation of Schubert’s Die Winterreise. These performances brought them to Wigmore Hall, Tokyo Bunkai Kaikan, and The Berlin Philharmonic. Engagements at international festivals include Huddersfield Contemporary Music Festival, De Yjsbrekker, Vienna Haus der Musik, Siljan Festival, Hohenems Schubertiade, and Belfast Festival. Petric remains a sought-after guest for international masterclasses and lectures across Europe, the United Kingdom, and North America.

In Canada, Petric has also performed at The Music Gallery, Musique Actuelle SRC, Nouvel Ensemble Moderne, McGill New Music Festival, Ottawa Chamber Music Festival, Festival BIC (St. Fabien Québec), Québec New Music Festival, VICTO Festival (Victoriaville, Québec), Winnipeg New Music Festival, Newfoundland Sound Symposium, and the Vancouver New Music Society.

Discography 
Petric's discography includes 38 titles on Naxos, Chandos Records, Musica Viva, CBC5000 Series, Analekta, Astrila, Centrediscs, and ConAccord labels. Many of Petric’s albums are thematic; for example Euphonia (2002) features works by female-identifying composers Linda C. Smith, Jocelyn Morlock, and Janika Vandervelde. Other thematic albums include the electroacoustic album Elektrologos (2010) with works by Hatzis, Pritchard and Lake, as well as  albums devoted to the music of Bach (Six Trio Sonatas, 2009), Scarlatti (Domenico Scarlatti: 18 Sonatas, 2008) and Rameau (Dialogues – Illuminations, 2002). His period-recording Victorian Romance (2009) includes works by Bernhard Molique and George Alexander McFarren performed by Streicher fortepianist Boyd McDonald.  

His concert documentaries and videos are available from EUTV5, CBC, and Array Music. Some of Petric's broadcasts are available through Canada’s CBC and Société Radio Canada archives.

Critical reception 
Petric’s innovative technique and repertoire have continued to captivate audiences and critics alike. After the Tanglewood Music Festival performance of the complete Berio Sequenzas in 2000, The Boston Globe pronounced: “an extraordinary performer…Petric was eloquent in the most offbeat, moving and nostalgic of the Sequenzas”. In 2009, The Halifax Chronicle Herald critic Stephen Pederson noted: “Petric is an old hand at making contemporary music sing, with unusual insight into how to clarify and project detail, as well as a superb sense of rhythmic design”. Peter Reed of London’s ClassicalSource noted Petric’s 2019 Wigmore Hall appearance for his “inspired use of the accordion...an extraordinary grasp of its ability to sound like breath from another planet”.

Research

Musicology 
Petric is a devoted pedagogue and offers specialized mentorship to a roster of international graduate students through his apprenticeship program. This dimension of his practice is supplemented by treatises such as Giuseppe Tartini’s The Art of Ornamentation (1759) and Adolf Beyschlag’s Die Ornamentik (1904), as well recent scholarly publications. These include Petric’s own The Concert Accordion: Contemporary Perspectives (2017), which combines musicological, historical, and interpretive approaches presented as companions to a living art. In this volume, Petric re-introduced Giovanni Gagliardi's treatise Le Petit Manual de L'Accordéoniste (Paris, 1911; reprint by Augemus, 2004) and his ‘circular bowing’ technique. Reconstructing the erasures of a classical accordion culture is another focus of the work. Petric achieves this by codifying 14 concert instrument patents filed 1890 to 1930. These patents were filed by Italian builders near Milan, Catania, Croce St. Spirito, Paris, Geneva, Bolzano, Philadelphia, New York City, and Chicago and draw the reader’s attention to hundreds of ignored and deserving concert accordion precursors from 1900 to 1960.
Petric is active in acoustic research and instrumental design; he worked with Canadian builder Leo Niemi to develop a design with reed blocks that deliver heightened reed response and sound projection in symphonic concertos. The design relied on violin-like sound posts for enhanced resonance in the largest of concert halls, and silicone-shellac finish similar to the one used on Stradivarius’ violins.

Publications 

 Petric, Joseph. The Concert Accordion: Contemporary Perspectives. Essen, Germany: , 2017. 328 pages.
 Petric, Joseph. The Holistic Accordion, a Manifesto: Fresh Perspectives of an Interpretive Art. Essen, Germany: Augemus Musikverlag, 2022. 55 pages.

Collaborations

Set Ensembles 

 Trio Diomira (2011): inclusive trio influenced by Indian, jazz, contemporary, and European classical traditions and texts, works by Dinuk Wijaratne
 Duo Contempera (2009): accordion and cello duo with David Hetheringto
 Biarc2 (2009): accordion and clarinet duo, contemporary works with Martin Carpentier accordion and clarinet duo, contemporary works with Martin Carpentier
 Petric / Forget Duo (2002–11): accordion and oboe, works ancient and new
 Pentaèdre (2004–present), Winterreise Project: Schubert's Winterreise adapted for wind quintet by N. Forget; performances with Christoph Prégardien
 Bellows and Brass (1999–present): trio for accordion, trombonist Alain Trudel, and triple virtuoso and actor Guy Few; commissioned works, theatrical creations, multi-media works, live video and interactive electronics, new and ancient music
 Erosonic (1994–present): accordion and baritone saxophone (David Mott); performing notated, com-provised, and electroacoustic works with staging, lighting and movement
 Petric / Penderecki Quartet (1994–present): commissions, collaborations and recordings, with staging, electronics and narrations
 Deep Listening (1989–97): duo with Pauline Oliveros
 Open Line (1991–2000): duo with accordion and multiple instrumentalist Guy Few (trumpets, Corno da caccia, piccolo trumpets, concert pianist, and actor); tours in Canada and United States

Artistic direction 

 The Big Squeeze Accordion Festival (1991), artistic co-director with Derek Andrews: 32 guest artists included Mogens Ellegaard, Friedrich Lips, Miny Dekkers, Pauline Oliveros, Flacko, Jimminez, El Jacquo di Jacqua; co-production with Toronto's Harbourfront Centre, CBC Radio, CBC Television, Ontario Arts Council, and Canada Council of the Arts.
 Virtuosi Series (1992), artistic director: series hosted at Glenn Gould Theatre Toronto featuring contemporary Canadian composers and virtuosi for CBC national new music program Two New Hours
 Carte Blanche (2000), artistic director: live to air national broadcast for Societe Radio Canada at Salle Pierre Péladeau, Montreal
 Carte Blanche (2002), artistic director: live to air national broadcast for Societe Radio Canada at Cathédral de Sainte Trinité, Quebec City
 Accordion on Fire (2010), artistic director: concerti by Current, Gougeon, and Piazzolla; performed with Tania Miller and Victoria Symphony
 Complete Berio Sequenza Collection (2013), artistic co-director with David Hetherington: first complete Canadian staging of Luciano Berio's Sequenza collection with Berio's original narrations of Sanguinetti's poetry, fully staged, University of Toronto New Music Festival

String ensembles 
String trios and quartets have comprised a significance portion of Petric's collaborative efforts. Composers Andrew Paul MacDonald (Quebec), Adrian Williams (UK), Yannick Plammondon (Quebec), and Éric Morin (Quebec) have had works premiered by Petric in collaboration with the Vanbrugh (Ireland) and Penderecki (Canada) Quartets. Combining traditional elements of the trio and quartet genres with modern styles, these premieres included strictly acoustic, electroacoustic, and theatrical works. Petric has also given premieres of works by Marjan Mozetich and Raymond Luedeke with the Amadeus and Adaskin Trios. Petric's complete list of trio and quartet collaborators includes:

 Galliard Trio, 1982 (Canada)
 Amadeus Ensemble, 1982–93 (Canada)
 Duke Quartet, 1992–94 (England)
 RTÉ Vanbrugh Quartet, 1994–2000 (Ireland)
 Penderecki Quartet, 1994–present (Canada)
 Arriaga Quartet, 1996–98 (Belgium)
 Alcan Quartet, 1996–99 (Quebec)
 Milverton Quartet, 1997 (Canada)
 Adaskin String Trio, 2000–06 (Canada)
 Quatour St. Germaine, 2008–10 (Quebec)
 Silver Birch Quartet, 2011 (Canada)

Accomplishments

Awards 

 CBC National Radio Auditions, Laureate (1980)
 BBC Radio3 Auditions, Laureate (1992): First accordionist laureate at BBC, London
 Ontario Arts Council, Hunter Prize for Best Recording (1999)
 JUNO nomination for Best Composition on CD Orbiting Garden (2002)
 Canadian Music Centre, Friend of Music Award (2005): First Canadian instrumentalist to receive the award for championing new Canadian composition
Canadian Music Centre, Ambassador of Canadian Music (2009): Awarded on November 9 to recognize "50 in 50" for their contributions to Canadian Music
 Prix Opus Best Concert Québec (2008)
 Prix Opus Best Recording Québec (2010)
 UNESCO, International Music Council, Confédération internationale des accordéonistes; Merit Award (2013): Presented in Victoria, British Columbia for contributions to international accordion art

Funding 
Petric's work has garnered support from Koussevitsky Foundation New York City, Canada Council for the Arts, Ontario Arts Council, QALC (Quebec Society of Arts and Letters), CBC Radio, Societé Radio Canada, Reikskonzerter (Sweden), Laidlaw Foundation (Toronto), and John Lewis Partnership (UK).

Affiliations 

 European Masterclasses, Lectures, Recitals: Royal Conservatories of Copenhagen (1986), Oslo (1986), Stockholm (1986), Helsinki (1986–91), Jyvaskylla (1986–91), Ikalliinen (1991), London (RAM, 1996), Maribor (2002), Amsterdam (2016), and the Staatliche Hochschule für Musik Trossingen (1977).
 Polish Masterclasses (2019): Conservatories of Katowice, Kraków, Gdańsk, Bydgoszcz, Poznań, and Nowy Targ
 French Masterclasses (2019): Conservatoire de Paris in Paris, Lille, Metz, Strasbourg, Normandy, Dunkirk, and Lyon
 Canadian Affiliations: Conservatory of Rimouski, Western Ontario Conservatory of Music (1977–78), Royal Hamilton College of Music(1977–80), Ontario Academy of Music (1980–90), University of Toronto Faculty of Music (2002–3, Jury Member for Bachelor's and master's degree recitals), University of British Columbia, Vancouver (2004, guest lecturer), and University of Montreal (2020, sessional lecturer)

References

Sources

External links
 

1952 births
Living people
Canadian accordionists
Canadian musicologists
Musicians from Guelph
People from Halton Hills
21st-century Canadian male musicians
21st-century accordionists